Alaba-Kʼabeena (Alaaba, Alaba, Allaaba, Halaba), also known as Wanbasana, is a Highland East Cushitic language spoken in Ethiopia by the Alaba and Kebena peoples in the Great Rift Valley southwest of Lake Shala, specifically in Alaba special district, the Kebena district of Gurage Zone, and the Goro district of Oromia Region. The literacy rate of native speakers in their language is below 1%, while their literacy rate in second languages is 8.6%; Alaba-Kʼabeena is taught in primary schools. It has an 81% lexical similarity with Kambaata. However, Fleming (1976) classifies Kʼabeena (also transliterated "Qebena" or "Kebena") as a dialect of Kambaata, and Blench (2006) classifies both as dialects of Kambaata. The 2007 census in Ethiopia lists Alaba and Qebena as separate languages.

A collection of over 400 proverbs in this language has been published with English translations.

Notes

References 
 Joachim Crass.  2005. "Das Kʼabeena, Deskriptive Grammatik einer hochlandostkuschitischen Sprache",  Cushitic Language Studies, 23.  Cologne:  Rüdiger Köppe Verlag.
 Gertrud Schneider-Blum.  2007.  "A Grammar of Alaaba, A Highland East Cushitic Language of Ethiopia",  Cushitic Language Studies, 25.  Cologne:  Rüdiger Köppe Verlag.

External links 

Languages of Ethiopia
East Cushitic languages